The Cyprus Workers' Confederation (SEK) is a trade union centre in Cyprus. It is affiliated with the International Trade Union Confederation, and the European Trade Union Confederation.

The Federations, which are members of SEK, represent and professionally express workers in sectors of the economy. Their main duty is to negotiate and achieve collective agreements.

The professional Federations, members of SEK, are as follows:

 Federation of Private Sector Workers
 Federation of Industrial Workers
 Federation of Builders, Miners and Relevant Professions
 Federation of Transport, Petroleum and Agriculture Workers
 Federation of Government, Military and Civil Services Workers
 Federation of Semi-Governmental Associations
 Federation of Hotel Industry Workers

References

External links
SEK Official Website

Trade unions in Cyprus
International Trade Union Confederation
European Trade Union Confederation
National federations of trade unions
Trade unions established in 1944